Zimmerberg (el. ) is a mountain and a region located in the district of Horgen in the canton of Zurich, Switzerland. Its name bases on the Old High German word zimbar in the meaning of lumber.

Geography 
Points of interest include Hüttnersee and, on the neighbouring Albis chain, Albishorn, Bürglen mountain, the observation tower near Schnabelburg, the Albis Pass, Felsenegg and the extensive woods known as Sihlwald. Sihl river borders Zimmerberg on its southern side, on the northeastern side it is bordered by the Lake Zürich. The area is wooded, but also has extensive fields, some cultivated. Being near the city Zurich, the area is a known recreation area.

The area alongside Lake Zürich had been formed as the left moraine of the Ice Age glacier, the bed of which is now the Lake Zürich and the valley of the Sihl river. The soil is mostly a conglomerate of gravel, some of it large, and glacial loess.

Region Zimmerberg and other meanings 
The term "Region Zimmerberg" usually refers to the mountain, the area and plateau between Kilchberg–Richterswil–Samstagern on Lake Zürich and partially to the Shil valley. This region includes the municipalities of Hirzel, Horgen, Hütten, Kilchberg, Oberrieden, Richterswil, Rüschlikon, Schönenberg, Thalwil, Wädenswil, and in the Sihl Valley the communities of Adliswil, Langnau am Albis and Sihlbrugg.

Zimmerberg is also used for many organizations on the left shore of the Lake Zurich, such as the Regional Hospital Zimmerberg (German: Spital Zimmerberg) in Horgen or Zimmerberg bus line (Zimmerbergbus) provided by the Sihltal Zürich Uetliberg Bahn. The Zimmerberg, a small motor ship of the Zürichsee-Schifffahrtsgesellschaft, is named after the mountain.

History 
Alamannic grave mounds have been found on the Zimmerberg.

See also 
 Zimmerbergbus

References

External links 

 Region Zimmerberg-Sihltal 

Geography of the canton of Zürich
Landforms of the canton of Zürich
Mountains of Switzerland
Regions of Switzerland
Mountains of the canton of Zürich
Mountains of Switzerland under 1000 metres